Steve Stanard is an American football coach and former player. He is the linebackers coach at Kansas State University, a position he has held since 2020. Stanard served as the interim defensive coordinator at Syracuse following the firing of Brian Ward after a blowout loss to Boston College late in the 2019 season. Stanard also served as the head football coach at Nebraska Wesleyan University from  1994 to 1995, compiling a record of 6–14. Stanard played college football at the University of Nebraska–Lincoln, where he lettered in 1987.

Head coaching record

References

Year of birth missing (living people)
Living people
American football defensive ends
Colorado State Rams football coaches
Nebraska Cornhuskers football coaches
Nebraska Cornhuskers football players
Nebraska Wesleyan Prairie Wolves football coaches
New Mexico State Aggies football coaches
North Dakota State Bison football coaches
South Dakota Coyotes football coaches
Syracuse Orange football coaches
Tulane Green Wave football coaches
Wyoming Cowboys football coaches
Sportspeople from Lincoln, Nebraska
Players of American football from Nebraska